The County of Savoy was a State of the Holy Roman Empire which emerged, along with the free communes of Switzerland, from the collapse of the Burgundian Kingdom in the 11th century. It was the cradle of the future Savoyard state.

History

Sapaudia, stretching south of Lake Geneva from the Rhône River to the Western Alps, had been part of Upper Burgundy ruled by the Bosonid duke Hucbert from the mid-9th century. Together with the neighboring Free County of Burgundy (today's Franche Comté), it became part of the larger Kingdom of Burgundy under King Rudolph II in 933.

Humbert the White-Handed was raised to count by the last king of Burgundy, Rudolph III, in 1003. He backed the inheritance claims of Emperor Henry II and in turn, was permitted to usurp the county of Aosta from its bishops at the death of Anselm. Following his support of Conrad II in annexing Arles upon Rudolph's death and suppressing the revolts of Count Odo and Bishop Burchard, he also received the county of Maurienne (formerly held by the archbishops of Vienne) and territories in Chablais and Tarentaise, formerly held by its archbishops at Moûtiers.

While the Arelat remained a titular kingdom of the Holy Roman Empire, Humbert's descendants—later known as the House of Savoy—maintained their independence as counts. In 1046, his younger son Otto married Adelaide, daughter of Ulric Manfred II, marquis of Susa. When she inherited her father's lands in preference to other, male, relatives, he thereby acquired control of the extensive March of Turin. This was then united with Savoy upon his inheritance from his elder brother.

The counts further enlarged their territory when, in 1218, they inherited the Vaud lands north of Lake Geneva from the extinct House of Zähringen. In 1220, Count Thomas I occupied the towns of Pinerolo and Chambéry (Kamrach), which afterwards became the Savoy capital. In 1240, his younger son Peter II was invited to England by King Henry III, who had married Peter's niece Eleanor of Provence. He was appointed Lord Warden of the Cinque Ports and Earl of Richmond and had the Savoy Palace erected in London.

In 1313, Count Amadeus V the Great officially gained the status of Imperial immediacy from Emperor Henry VII. What was left of the Kingdom of Burgundy effectively ceased to be entirely under the authority of the emperor after the Dauphiné had passed to the future King Charles V of France in 1349 and Amadeus VI of Savoy was appointed Imperial vicar of Arelat by Emperor Charles IV in 1365.

Amadeus VII gained access to the Mediterranean Sea by the acquisition of the County of Nice in 1388, and his son Amadeus VIII purchased the County of Geneva in 1401. The extended Savoy lands were finally raised to a duchy in 1416 by the German king Sigismund (see Duchy of Savoy 1416–1718).

Counts of Savoy

Humbert I the White-Handed: 1003–1047/48
Amadeus I of the Tail, son: 1030/48–1051/56
Otto I, brother: 1051/56–1060
Peter I, son: 1060–78
Amadeus II, brother: 1078–80
Humbert II the Fat, brother: 1082/91–1103
Amadeus III, son: 1103–48
Humbert III the Blessed, son: 1148–89
Thomas, son: 1189–1233
Amadeus IV, son: 1233–53
Boniface, son: 1253–63
Peter II the Little Charlemagne, uncle: 1263–68
Philip I, brother: 1268–85
(Thomas, Count of Flanders, did not rule Savoy)
Amadeus V the Great, nephew: 1285–1323
Edward the Liberal, son: 1323–29
Aymon the Peaceful, brother: 1329–43
Amadeus VI the Green Count, son: 1343–83
Amadeus VII the Red Count, son: 1383–91
Amadeus VIII the Peaceful, son: 1391–1416

In 1416 Amadeus VIII was raised to the status of Duke of Savoy.

See also
Savoie
Haute-Savoie

Notes

References

Further reading
 Taylor, A.J. and Lewis is Savoy. "A Letter from Lewis of Savoy to Edward I" The English Historical Review, Vol. 68, No. 266 (Jan., 1953), 56–62 

 
States and territories established in 1003
County of Savoy
Geographic history of Italy
Geographic history of France
1000s establishments in the Holy Roman Empire
1003 establishments in Europe
1410s disestablishments in the Holy Roman Empire
1416 disestablishments in Europe
Duchy of Savoy
Counties of the Holy Roman Empire

de:Savoyen#Grafen von Savoyen